Rudolf Schönbeck (3 August 1919 – 6 November 2003) was a German footballer who played as a goalkeeper for VfB Königsberg, Itzehoer SV 09 and FC St. Pauli. He also competed in the 1952 Summer Olympics.

References

1919 births
2003 deaths
German footballers
Association football goalkeepers
Olympic footballers of Germany
Footballers at the 1952 Summer Olympics
FC St. Pauli players
German footballers needing infoboxes